Affairs of the Heart is a 2017 Nollywood film that tells a story about the feelings and emotions that a lady has for a man which is going to cost her whole life to fall apart.

Cast
 Stella Damasus
 Beverly Naya
 Joseph Benjamin
 Cycerli Ash
 Joel Rogers

References

External links
 

2017 films
Nigerian romance films
English-language Nigerian films
2017 romance films
2010s English-language films